Erwin Lutwak (born 9 February 1946, Chernivtsi, now Ukraine), is a mathematician. Lutwak is professor emeritus at the Courant Institute of Mathematical Sciences at New York University in New York City.  His main research interests are convex geometry and its connections with analysis and information theory.

Biography
He spent the earliest years of his childhood in the Soviet Union, Romania, Israel, Italy, and Venezuela before he settled in Brooklyn when he was ten. He graduated from the Polytechnic Institute of Brooklyn, now New York University Tandon School of Engineering with a B.S. in 1968, a M.S. in 1972 and with a Ph.D. in 1974.  Before he became professor at the Courant Institute at NYU, he was a professor at New York University Tandon School of Engineering. His first position in 1975 was at the Polytechnic Institute of New York (which was created as a result of the merger of the Polytechnic Institute of Brooklyn and the NYU School of Engineering).

He is a member of the editorial boards of the Advances in Mathematics,
the Canadian Journal of Mathematics, the Canadian Mathematical Bulletin, and the Cambridge University Press Encyclopedia of Mathematics and its Applications.

Work
Erwin Lutwak is known for his Dual Brunn Minkowski Theory, 
his notion of intersection body and his contribution to the solution of the Busemann–Petty problem, for proving the long-conjectured upper-semicontinuity of affine surface area, his contributions to the Lp Brunn Minkowski Theory and, in particular, his Lp Minkowski problem and its solution in important cases.

Honors
 Lutwak became an Inaugural Fellow of the American Mathematical Society in 2012.
 He received an honorary doctorate of the TU Wien in 2014.

Personal life
Dr. Lutwak is married to Nancy Lutwak, M.D.. They have one daughter, Hope Lutwak, who graduated with a Bachelor of Science in 2018 from the Massachusetts Institute of Technology. The family resides in Manhattan.

Notable publications

References

External links

20th-century American mathematicians
21st-century American mathematicians
Geometers
Courant Institute of Mathematical Sciences faculty
Polytechnic Institute of New York University alumni
Polytechnic Institute of New York University faculty
1946 births
Living people
Fellows of the American Mathematical Society